Suzanne Jill Levine  is an American writer, poet, literary translator and scholar.

Levine was born in New York City where she studied piano at Juilliard and went to Music & Art High School.

She earned a BA at Vassar College in 1967, an MA at Columbia University in 1969, and a PhD at New York University in 1977. A scholar of Latin American literature, her books include one of the first studies of Gabriel García Márquez's One Hundred Years of Solitude and Adolfo Bioy Casares, both published in Spanish. She is also a leading specialist in Translation Studies and Comparative Literature. Her 1991 book, The Subversive Scribe, was influential on the development of translation theory in the United States and elsewhere. She has written two poetry chapbooks and hundreds of essays in major anthologies and journals. She is a translator of a range of writers including Silvina Ocampo, Clarice Lispector, Cecilia Vicuña, Jorge Luis Borges, Manuel Puig, Adolfo Bioy Casares, Carlos Fuentes, José Donoso, Julio Cortázar and Guillermo Cabrera Infante.

Levine is an honorary member of IAPTI. She has been recipient of numerous grants and awards from the National Endowment of the Arts (NEA) and for the Humanities (NEH).

Awards (selection)
 PEN Center USA's Translation Award 2012
 John Simon Guggenheim Fellowship 1997
 PEN American Gregory Kolovakis Award in Hispanic Letters 1996
 Rockefeller Fellow, Villa Serbelloni Residency, Lake Como 1998

Selected bibliography

Books 

 El espejo hablado: un estudio de Cien años de soledad (1975)
 Guia de Adolfo Bioy Casares (1982)
 The Subversive Scribe: Translating Latin American Fiction (Graywolf Press, 1991; Dalkey Archive, 2009).
 Manuel Puig and the Spider Woman: His Life and Fictions (Farrar Straus & Giroux, 2001; Faber & Faber, 2000; University of Wisconsin, 2001).

Poems 

 Reckoning (Finishing Line, 2012)

Translations 

 Betrayed by Rita Hayworth, by Manuel Puig (Dutton, 1971; Avon Books; Random House; Dalkey Archive, 2009).
 Three Trapped Tigers, by Guillermo Cabrera Infante (trans. with Donald Gardner) (Harper & Row, 1971; Avon Books, 1985, Faber & Faber, 1990).
 Triple Cross, a volume of three novellas: Hell Has No Limits, by José Donoso; Holy Place, by Carlos Fuentes; From Cuba with a Song, by Severo Sarduy (1972).
 All Fires the Fire, short stories by Julio Cortázar (1973; Pantheon, 1988).
 Heartbreak Tango, by Manuel Puig (Dutton, 1973; Random House; Dalkey Archive, 2010).
 A Plan for Escape, by Adolfo Bioy Casares (Dutton, 1975; Graywolf Press, 1988).
 Cobra, by Severo Sarduy (Dutton, 1975).
 The Buenos Aires Affair, by Manuel Puig (Dutton, 1976; Random House, 1980; Faber & Faber, 1989; Dalkey Archive, 2010).
 Asleep in the Sun, by Adolfo Bioy Casares (Persea Books, 1978; Dutton, 1989).
 View of Dawn in the Tropics, by Guillermo Cabrera Infante (Harper & Row, 1978).
 A House in the Country, by José Donoso (trans. with David Pritchard) (Alfred A. Knopf, 1984; Random House, 1985).
 Infante’s Inferno, by Guillermo Cabrera Infante (Harper & Row, 1984; Avon Books; Faber & Faber, 1987).
 Maitreya, by Severo Sarduy (Ediciones del Norte, 1987).
 Adventures of a Photographer in La Plata, by Adolfo Bioy Casares (Dutton, 1989; Penguin; Bloomsbury).
 Larva, by Julián Ríos (trans. with Richard Alan Francis) (Dalkey Archive, 1990).
 Tropical Night Falling, by Manuel Puig (Simon & Schuster, 1991; Faber & Faber, 1992).
 Unravelling Words & the Weaving of Water, by Cecilia Vicuña (trans. with Eliot Weinberger) (Graywolf Press, 1991).
 A Russian Doll and Other Stories, by Adolfo Bioy Casares (New Directions, 1992).
 The Selected Stories of Adolfo Bioy Casares (New Directions, 1994).
 Christ on the Rue Jacob, by Severo Sarduy (trans. with Carol Maier) (Mercury House, 1995).
 Selected Non-Fictions by Jorge Luis Borges (edited by Eliot Weinberger; trans. with Esther Allen and Eliot Weinberger) (Viking, 1999).
 Beach Birds, by Severo Sarduy, (trans. with Carol Maier) (Otis Books/Seismicity Editions, 2007).
The Lizard's Tale, by José Donoso (2011).
Mundo Cruel: Stories, by Luis Negrón (2013).
Where There’s Love, There’s Hate, by Silvina Ocampo (trans. with Jessica Powell) (Melville House, 2013).
 The Taiga Syndrome, by Cristina Rivera Garza (trans. with Aviva Kana) (Dorothy Project, 2018).
 The Promise, by Silvina Ocampo (trans. with Jessica Powell) (City Lights, 2019).
Forgotten Journey, by Silvina Ocampo (trans. with Katie Lateef-Jan) (City Lights, 2019).
 Bezoar and Other Unsettling Stories, by Guadalupe Nettel (Seven Stories Press, 2020).

References

External links
 Website of Suzanne Jill Levine

1946 births
Living people
Vassar College alumni
Columbia University alumni
New York University alumni
University of California, Santa Barbara faculty
American translation scholars
American translators
Spanish–English translators
American literary critics
Women literary critics
American women non-fiction writers
21st-century American women
American women critics